David John Haggo (born 13 April 1964 in Ayr, Scotland) is a Scottish cricketer who played five First-class and 18 List A matches for Scotland national cricket team from 1983 to 1995 including in 1989 Benson & Hedges Cup till 1995 Benson & Hedges Cup. Domestically, Haggo played for the Prestwick Cricket Club in the Scottish National Cricket League (SNCL) as well as with West of Scotland Cricket Club.

References

1964 births
Living people
Scottish cricket coaches
Scottish cricketers
Sportspeople from Ayr
Wicket-keepers